The Venezuela national basketball team is organized and run by the Venezuelan Basketball Federation (FVB). They won the 2015 FIBA AmeriCup.

Venezuela qualified for two Summer Olympiads: 1992, and then 2016. Venezuela hosted the 2012 FIBA Olympic Qualifying Tournament, the country's most prestigious basketball event ever. Later, the country also hosted the 2013 FIBA AmeriCup.

Venezuela has participated in international competitions: International Basketball Federation (FIBA), Summer Olympic Games, the FIBA World Cup, the South American Championship, the Pan American Games and the Bolivarian Games.

Honours
FIBA AmeriCup
Winners: 2015

Achievements

Summer Olympics

FIBA World Cup

FIBA AmeriCup

Pan American Games

 1955 – 6th
 1975 – 8th
 1983 – 8th
 1987 – 8th
 1991 – 10th
 2015 – 7th
 2019 – 5th

FIBA South American Championship

 1961 – 8th
 1979 – 5th
 1985 – 4th
 1987 – 
 1991 – 
 1993 – 
 1995 – 4th
 1997 – 
 1999 – 
 2001 – 
 2003 – 4th
 2004 – 
 2006 – 4th
 2008 – 
 2010 – 4th
 2012 – 
 2014 – 
 2016 –

Bolivarian Games
 2001 – 
 2005 – 
 2009 – 
 2013 –

Team

Current roster
Roster for the 2022 FIBA AmeriCup.

Depth chart

Notable players
Other notable players from Venezuela:

Head coach position
  Jesus Cordobés: 1990
  Julio Toro: 1992
  Guillermo Vecchio: 1998
  Bruno D'Adezzio: 1999
  Jim Calvin: 2002
  Néstor Salazar: 2003–2007
  Nelson Solórzano: 2008
  Nestor Salazar: 2009–2010
  Eric Musselman: 2011–2012
  Che García: 2013–2017
  Fernando Duró: 2018–present

Past rosters

Scroll down to see more.
1990 World Championship: finished 11th among 16 teams

4 David Díaz, 5 Cesar Portillo, 6 Armando Becker, 7 Nelson Solorzano, 8 Rostin González, 9 Luis Jiménez, 10 Sam Shepherd, 11 Carl Herrera, 12 José Echenique, 13 Gabriel Estaba, 14 Iván Olivares, 15 Alexander Nelcha (Coach: Jesus Cordobés)

1992 Olympic Games: finished 11th among 12 teams

4 Víctor Díaz, 5 David Diaz, 6 Melquiades Jaramillo, 7 Nelson Solorzano, 8 Rostin González, 9 Luis Jiménez, 10 Sam Shepherd, 11 Carl Herrera, 12 Omar Walcott, 13 Gabriel Estaba, 14 Iván Olivares, 15 Alexander Nelcha (Coach: Julio Toro)

2002 World Championship: finished 14th among 16 teams

4 Víctor Díaz, 5 Pablo Ezequiel Machado, 6 Yumerving Ernesto Mijares, 7 Richard Lugo, 8 Alejandro "Alex" Quiroz, 9 Óscar Torres, 10 Diego Guevara, 11 Carl Herrera,  12 Héctor "Pepito" Romero, 13 Vladimir Heredia, 14 Tomas Aguilera, 15 Carlos Morris (Coach: Jim Calvin)

2006 World Championship: finished 21st among 24 teams

4 Víctor Díaz,  5 Pablo Machado, 6 Yumerving Ernesto Mijares, 7 Richard Lugo, 8 Tomás Aguilera, 9 Óscar Torres, 10 Carlos Alberto Cedeno, 11 Miguel Marriaga, 12 Gregory Vallenilla, 13 Manuel Alejandro Barrios, 14 Heberth Alberto Bayona, 15 Carlos Morris (Coach: Néstor Salazar)

See also
Venezuela national under-19 basketball team
Venezuela national under-17 basketball team
Venezuela national 3x3 team
Venezuela women's national basketball team

References

External links
 
FIBA profile
Venezuela Basketball Records at FIBA Archive
Latinbasket – Venezuela Men National Team

Videos
Venezuela v Brazil – Game Highlights – Gold-Medal Match – 2016 FIBA South American Championship Youtube.com video
Venezuela v Argentina – Gold Medal Game Highlights – 2015 FIBA Americas Championship Youtube.com video

1938 establishments in Venezuela